Michael Green (born July 16, 1978) is a former American soccer player who played for Kansas City Wizards in the MLS.

Career statistics

Club

Notes

References

1978 births
Living people
American soccer players
Association football defenders
Sporting Kansas City players
MLS Pro-40 players
Pittsburgh Riverhounds SC players
Charleston Battery players
Northern Virginia Royals players
Major League Soccer players
USL League Two players
USL Championship players